Al-Hayyu Group of Schools is an Islamic school, founded in September 2001 in Ibadan, Oyo state, Nigeria. The pupils are taught in English, Yoruba, French and Arabic languages.

References

2001 establishments in Nigeria
Islamic schools in Africa
Schools in Ibadan